Pat Occhiuto is a retired Italian-American soccer forward who played professionally in the American Soccer League, United Soccer League, Major Indoor Soccer League and National Professional Soccer League.

Occhiuto attended Erie Community College where he played soccer in 1975 and 1976.  He was inducted into the Erie Community College Hall of Fame in 1998.  He then transferred to SUNY Fredonia where he completed his collegiate soccer eligibility with three seasons on the men’s soccer team.  In 1989, the school inducted Occhiuto into its Athletic Hall of Fame.  In 1979, he signed with the Buffalo Stallions of the Major Indoor Soccer League.  In 1981, he played for the Rochester Flash of the American Soccer League.  That fall, he moved to the Kansas City Comets before returning to the Stallions for one more season.  In 1984, he played for the Buffalo Storm of the United Soccer League.  Occhiuto later played for the Buffalo Blizzard of the National Professional Soccer League.

References

External links
 MISL stats

Living people
1957 births
American soccer players
American Soccer League (1933–1983) players
Buffalo Blizzard players
Buffalo Stallions players
Buffalo Storm players
Kansas City Comets (original MISL) players
Major Indoor Soccer League (1978–1992) players
National Professional Soccer League (1984–2001) players
Rochester Flash players
United Soccer League (1984–85) players
People of Calabrian descent
Association football forwards
Association football midfielders